Ove Liavaag (29 May 1938 - 19 December 2007) was a Norwegian civil servant.

He was the director of the Norwegian Civil Aviation Administration from 1989 to 2000. Prior to this he was technical director of the same organization from 1981. He was a siv. ing. by education.

References

1938 births
2007 deaths
Directors of government agencies of Norway
Avinor people